The 2023 DFB-Pokal Final will decide the winner of the 2022–23 DFB-Pokal, the 80th season of the annual German football cup competition. The match will be played on 3 June 2023 at the Olympiastadion in Berlin.

The winner will host the 2023 edition of the DFL-Supercup at the start of the following season, and will face the champion of the 2022–23 edition of the Bundesliga, unless the same team wins the Bundesliga and the DFB-Pokal, completing a double. In that case, the runner-up of the Bundesliga will take the spot and host instead. The winner of the DFB-Pokal also earns automatic qualification for the group stage of the 2023–24 edition of the UEFA Europa League. However, if the winner has already qualified for the 2023–24 edition of the UEFA Champions League through their position in the Bundesliga, then the spot will go to the team in sixth, and the league's UEFA Europa Conference League play-off round spot will go to the team in seventh.

Teams
In the following table, finals until 1943 were in the Tschammerpokal era, since 1953 were in the DFB-Pokal era.

Route to the final
The DFB-Pokal began with 64 teams in a single-elimination knockout cup competition. There were a total of five rounds leading up to the final. Teams were drawn against each other, and the winner after 90 minutes would advance. If still tied, 30 minutes of extra time was played. If the score was still level, a penalty shoot-out was used to determine the winner.

Note: In all results below, the score of the finalist is given first (H: home; A: away).

Match

Details

See also
2023 DFL-Supercup
Football in Berlin

Notes

References

External links
 

2023
2022–23 in German football cups

Football competitions in Berlin
June 2023 sports events in Germany
2023 in Berlin